His Excellency may refer to:
 His or Her Excellency, an honorific style for holders of high offices of state or religion
 His Excellency (opera), an 1894 comic opera by W. S. Gilbert and F. Osmond Carr
 Her Excellency (musical), a 1949 stage musical by Manning Sherwin and Harold Purcell
 His Excellency (play), a 1950 play by Campbell Christie and Dorothy Christie
 His Excellency (1928 film), a 1928 Soviet drama film
 His Excellency (1944 film), a 1944 Swedish film
 His Excellency (1952 film), a 1952 British film
 His Excellency (1958 film), a 1958 Australian television film
 His Excellency: George Washington, a 2004 book about George Washington by Joseph J. Ellis